The International University of Professional Studies (IUPS), formerly known as Inoorero University (IU), was a university located in Nairobi in Kenya. It was formerly a middle-level college.

References

External links

Universities and colleges in Kenya
Educational institutions established in 1983
1983 establishments in Kenya
Education in Nairobi